Princeton is a census-designated place (CDP) and unincorporated community in Miami-Dade County, Florida, United States. The population was 39,208 at the 2020 census, up from 22,038 at the 2010 census.

History 

As a small town and depot along the Florida East Coast Railroad in the 1900s, the community was named by Gaston Drake after his alma mater, Princeton University. Many of the town buildings were even painted the school's colors: black and orange. Drake operated a saw mill and lumber company in Princeton supplying Miami, the Florida Keys and Cuba until the local timber gave out in 1923.

Geography 
It is bordered to the north by Goulds and to the southwest by Naranja, both unincorporated.

U.S. Route 1 (Dixie Highway) runs northeast to southwest through Princeton, and the Homestead Extension of Florida's Turnpike forms the eastern edge of the community, with access from Exit 9 (Florida State Road 989).

Demographics

2020 census

As of the 2020 United States census, there were 39,308 people, 8,356 households, and 7,058 families residing in the CDP.

2000 census
As of the census of 2000, there were 10,090 people, 2,732 households, and 2,341 families residing in the CDP. The racial makeup of the CDP was 53.78% White (18% were Non-Hispanic White,) 32.54% African American, 0.34% Native American, 1.37% Asian, 0.06% Pacific Islander, 7.70% from other races, and 4.22% from two or more races. Hispanic or Latino of any race were 47.49% of the population.

There were 2,732 households, out of which 52.4% had children under the age of 18 living with them, 56.8% were married couples living together, 22.4% had a female householder with no husband present, and 14.3% were non-families. 10.0% of all households were made up of individuals, and 2.3% had someone living alone who was 65 years of age or older. The average household size was 3.63 and the average family size was 3.85.

In the CDP, the population was spread out, with 36.1% under the age of 18, 10.2% from 18 to 24, 30.0% from 25 to 44, 17.7% from 45 to 64, and 6.0% who were 65 years of age or older. The median age was 28 years. For every 100 females, there were 97.0 males. For every 100 females age 18 and over, there were 92.6 males.

The median income for a household in the CDP was $39,556, and the median income for a family was $41,896. Males had a median income of $32,101 versus $23,634 for females. The per capita income for the CDP was $12,918. About 19.8% of families and 23.8% of the population were below the poverty line, including 33.1% of those under age 18 and 14.4% of those age 65 or over.

As of 2000, speakers of English as a first language accounted for 50.02% of residents; Spanish made up 49.24%, and French Creole was the first language for 0.72% of the population.

As of 2000, Princeton had the thirty-seventh highest percentage of Cuban residents in the U.S., with 12.94% of the populace. It had the seventy-ninth highest percentage of Puerto Rican residents in the U.S., at 10% of the population, and the twenty-first highest percentage of Nicaraguan residents in the U.S., at 2.15% of its population. It also had the ninety-third most Colombians in the U.S., at 1.77% (tied with South Miami and Westchester, FL,) while it had the 118th highest percentage of Dominicans, at 1.33% of all residents (tied with Peabody, Massachusetts.)

See also
Naranja-Princeton, a single census area recorded during the 1980 Census.

References 

Census-designated places in Miami-Dade County, Florida
Unincorporated communities in Miami-Dade County, Florida